Otages de l'Ultralum (Hostages of the Ultralum) is volume sixteen in the French comic book (or bande dessinée) science fiction series Valérian and Laureline created by writer Pierre Christin and artist Jean-Claude Mézières.

Principal characters
 Valérian, from Galaxity, lost capital of Earth in the 28th century, formerly a Spatio-Temporal Agent, now working on a freelance basis
 Laureline, from 11th century France, formerly a Spatio-Temporal Agent for Galaxity, now working on a freelance basis
 Jal, another former Spatio-Temporal Agent from Galaxity. Now living in exile in Earth's abandoned segment on Point Central.
 Kistna, a female from the planet Wûûrm
 The Caliph of Iksaladam
 The Caliphon, son of the Caliph of Iksaladam
 The Caliph's three concubines
 The Mortis Quartet, a criminal gang who specialise in trafficking, smuggling, extortion, attacks, commandos, infiltrations and abductions.
 Schniarfeur, a living weapon from the planet Bromn. It has had its chabounal gland pinned to control its high aggression levels.
 Frankie and Harry, twin detectives joined together like Siamese twins but with amazing regenerative powers if one is injured
 The captain of the Ultralum barge that carries the Mortis Quartet and their captives from Point Central to Iksaladam
 The President of the council of Point Central
 The Shingouz, three aliens who trade in information
 The Extralums, the down-trodden extractors of the valuable Ultralum fuel.

Settings
 A luxury hotel on an unnamed yellow and orange coloured planet where Valérian and Laureline are spending their vacation. They have also been brought on excursions to:
 Kokok'Um. To see the underwater colonnades.
 Tak. To see the crystalloid formations which remind Laureline of the asteroid belt surrounding Alflolol.
 An unnamed planet to watch the primitive wildlife.
 Point Central, the vast space station where all the races of the cosmos meet, previously seen in Ambassador of the Shadows and On the Frontiers. Point Central is made up of many different segments:
 Earth's segment, ruined and crumbling just like it was in On the Frontiers. Its sole occupant remains Jal.
 A service astroport on the dark side of Point Central used by several races. It is from here that the Mortis Quartet transfer their prisoners to the stellar barge that takes them to Iksaladam.
 The Caliph addresses the assembled dignitaries in the vast Hall of Screens, the meeting place for Point Central's council.
 Laureline's Tchoung-tracer passes through several segments of Point Central previously seen in Ambassador of the Shadows and On the Frontiers while searching for Valérian:
 The endless corridors and passageways that connect the segments maintained by the mute Zools.
 The Groubos and their Zuur pilots.
 The warlike Kamuniks.
 The Marmakas.
 The Pulpissim's market.
 Iksaladam, the area of the cosmos richest in the valuable Ultralum fuel needed to power the spatio-temporal engines of most races' spaceships. The high concentration of Ultralum causes frequent distortions in the local fabric of space-time and, as a result, the entire region is a shambles of planets, asteroids, comets, debris and dust. The only people capable of navigating it are the old space dogs that carry the Ultralum fuel in their barges and the Caliph's navy who have highly sophisticated tracking and detection equipment. Iksaladam is ruled by its Caliph, descended from the prophet, one of the richest men in the cosmos, who rules from his vast palace on the central planet in the Iksaladam system. The Ultralum is mined by the Extralums (short for Extractors of Ultralum) who use mobile extraction wells which are capable of adapting to the spatio-temporal instability of the region. Nevertheless, Ultralum mining is highly hazardous and accidents are very common.

Notes
 Kistna and Jal previously appeared in On the Frontiers
 The Grumpy Converter from Bluxte has been previously seen in Ambassador of the Shadows and The Circles of Power.
 The Tchoung-tracer has been previously seen in On the Frontiers
 A Schniarfeur first appeared in The Living Weapons.
 This album marks the first appearances of the Mortis Quartet and the twin detectives Frankie and Harry.
 This album won the Tournesal Award, given to the comic that best reflects the ideals of the Green Party, at the 1997 Angoulême International Comics Festival.

1996 graphic novels
Valérian and Laureline